The Great Glinka is a 1946 Soviet biopic film directed by Lev Arnshtam. The film is about Mikhail Glinka, a Russian composer of the 19th century. The film was awarded the Stalin Prize of II degree (1947) and it was entered into the 1946 Cannes Film Festival.

Plot

Cast
 Boris Chirkov as Mikhail Glinka
 Valentina Serova as Maria Ivanova-Glinka
 Klavdiya Polovikova as Luiza Ivanova
 Vasili Merkuryev as Yakob Ulanov
 Kira Golovko as Anna Kern
 Mikhail Nazvanov as hussar Kostya
 Boris Livanov as Emperor Nicholas I of Russia
 Alexander Shatov as Alexander von Benckendorff
 Nikolay Svobodin as Baron Yegor Rosen
 Pyotr Aleynikov as Alexander Pushkin
 Mikhail Derzhavin as Vasily Zhukovsky
 Mikhail Yanshin as Pyotr Vyazemsky
 Victor Koltsov as Vladimir Odoevsky
 Vladimir Druzhnikov as Kondraty Ryleyev
 Vladimir Vladislavsky as Mikhail Vielgorsky
 Maxim Mikhailov as Osip Petrov
 Yevgeny Kaluzhsky as old dignitary
 Georgy Vitsin as spectator at the premiere (uncredited)

References

External links

1946 films
1946 drama films
1940s biographical drama films
Soviet biographical drama films
Russian biographical drama films
1940s Russian-language films
Russian black-and-white films
Soviet black-and-white films
Films directed by Lev Arnshtam
Films about classical music and musicians
Films about composers
Films set in the 19th century
Cultural depictions of Nicholas I of Russia